Iranian-Tunisian relations refers to the bilateral tie between Iran and Tunisia.

Historical and modern relations
Unlike the majority of the Arab world which is deeply hostile to Iran, Tunisia is one of the few Arab countries to develop good relations with Iran in modern times, especially ever since the Iranian Revolution of 1979 and the establishment of the Islamic Republic. Tunisia's neutrality has given them a good image on their relations, and somehow annoyed Saudi Arabia.

Tunisia was one of the few Arab countries to express condolence over the 2017 Tehran attacks, and both two countries expressed that there would be no limit on increased cooperation between Iran and Tunisia.

Tunisia, together with Algeria, have been accused of praising Iran, which both states have denied.

Tunisia also acts as a neutral and balanced power to balance the standoff between Iran and Saudi Arabia.

References

External links

 
Iran
Tunisia